was the twentieth of twenty-four s that were built for the Imperial Japanese Navy following World War I. When introduced into service, these ships were the most powerful destroyers in the world. They served as first-line destroyers through the 1930s, and remained formidable weapons systems well into the Pacific War. Ushio was one of only two of the 24 ships in its class to survive World War II, and it was also the only survivor out of the 22 combat ships involved in the Pearl Harbor assault force.

History
Construction of the advanced Fubuki-class destroyers was authorized as part of the Imperial Japanese Navy's expansion program from fiscal 1923, intended to give Japan a qualitative edge with the world's most modern ships. The Fubuki class had performance that was a quantum leap over previous destroyer designs, so much so that they were designated . The large size, powerful engines, high speed, large radius of action and unprecedented armament gave these destroyers the firepower similar to many light cruisers in other navies. Ushio, built at the Uraga Dock Company was the tenth in an improved series, which incorporated a modified gun turret which could elevate her main battery of Type 3 127 mm 50 caliber naval guns to 75° as opposed to the original 40°, thus permitting the guns to be used as dual purpose guns against aircraft. Ushio was laid down on 24 December 1929, launched on 17 November 1930 and commissioned on 15 November 1931. Originally assigned hull designation “Destroyer No. 54”, she was designated Ushio before her launch.

Operational history
In 1932, after the First Shanghai Incident, Ushio was assigned to patrols of the Yangtze River. In 1935, after the Fourth Fleet Incident, in which a large number of ships were damaged by a typhoon, she, along with her sister ships, were modified with stronger hulls and increased displacement. From 1937, Ushio covered landing of Japanese forces in Shanghai and Hangzhou during the Second Sino-Japanese War. From 1940, she was assigned to patrol and cover landings of Japanese forces in south China, and subsequently participated in the Invasion of French Indochina.

World War II history
At the time of the attack on Pearl Harbor, Ushio was assigned to Destroyer Division 7 of the IJN 1st Air Fleet, and had deployed from Tateyama Naval Air Station as part of the force which bombarded Midway Atoll in the opening stages of the war.

Ushio was part of the escort for the aircraft carriers  and  during air strikes against Ambon. She was subsequently was part of the escort for the cruisers  and  during the Japanese invasion of the eastern Netherlands East Indies. On 2 March, at the Battle of the Java Sea, Ushio assisted in attacking the submarine , with depth charges and taking on 59 survivors. She returned to Yokosuka Naval Arsenal for repairs at the end of March.

Ushio subsequently escorted aircraft carrier  to Truk, at the Battle of the Coral Sea. On 4–5 June, Ushio participated in the Battle of Midway as was part of the diversionary Aleutian Invasion force and was subsequently based at Ōminato Guard District for patrols of northern waters until mid-July.

On 14 July, Ushio was reassigned to the Combined Fleet, and escorted the battleship  and aircraft carrier  at the Battle of the Eastern Solomons on 24 August, returning with Yamato to Truk after the battle.

She was then assigned to numerous "Tokyo Express" transport missions to various locations in the Solomon Islands in September.

In early 1944, Ushio was assigned to escort duty, mostly of troop convoys from Truk. From April through August, she was based at Ōminato Guard District for patrols of northern waters, and escort of ships between Hokkaidō and Yokosuka or Kure.

During the Battle of Leyte Gulf, Ushio was assigned to Admiral Kiyohide Shima’s Diversionary Force at the Battle of Surigao Strait, remaining based in Manila after the battle to escort convoys in the Philippines. She was damaged on 13 September, during an American air raid on Manila, during which her starboard engine was disabled, and 23 crewmen killed. After repairs were made in Singapore in November, Ushio was reassigned to the IJN 2nd Fleet. In December, she assisted the disabled cruiser .

Returning to Yokosuka Naval Arsenal for repairs, Ushio remained in Japanese waters until the surrender of Japan. On 18 July 1945 she provided antiaircraft fire to defend the battleship  during the attack on Yokosuka. On 15 September 1945, Ushio was removed from the navy list. She was broken up for scrap in 1948.

Notes

References

External links

Fubuki-class destroyers
Ships built by Uraga Dock Company
1930 ships
Second Sino-Japanese War naval ships of Japan
World War II destroyers of Japan
Ships of the Aleutian Islands campaign